Caladenia footeana, commonly known as the crimson spider orchid, is a species of orchid endemic to the south-west of Western Australia. It has a single, hairy leaf and one or two, relatively small pinkish-red flowers with a white, red-striped labellum. Its relatively small size makes it hard to find in its surroundings.

Description
Caladenia footeana is a terrestrial, perennial, deciduous, herb with an underground tuber and which often grows in small clumps of up to ten plants. The flowers are dark pinkish-red with maroon markings and the sepals and petals have long, thread-like tips. The petals are about the same size as the lateral sepals and hang similarly. The sides of the labellum have short, blunt teeth and the tip of the labellum is curved downwards. There are two rows of reddish, anvil-shaped calli along the centre of the labellum. Flowering occurs from July to early October.

Taxonomy and naming
Caladenia footeana was first described in 2001 by Stephen Hopper and Andrew Phillip Brown from a specimen collected near a creek in Cockleshell Gully near Jurien Bay and the description was published in Nuytsia. The specific epithet (footeana) honours Herbert Foote, the first president of an Australian orchid study group.

Distribution and habitat
Crimson spider orchid occurs between Cranbrook and Binnu in the Avon Wheatbelt, Coolgardie, Geraldton Sandplains, Jarrah Forest and Swan Coastal Plain biogeographic regions where it grows in woodland or dense shrubland, and sometimes on granite outcrops.

Conservation
Caladenia footeana  is classified as "not threatened" by the Government of Western Australia Department of Parks and Wildlife.

References

footeana
Orchids of Western Australia
Endemic orchids of Australia
Plants described in 2001
Endemic flora of Western Australia
Taxa named by Stephen Hopper
Taxa named by Andrew Phillip Brown